Rovnoye is a rural locality (a settlement) in Valuysky District, Belgorod Oblast, Russia. The population was 212 as of 2010. There are 6 streets.

Geography 
Rovnoye is located 15 km southeast of Valuyki (the district's administrative centre) by road. Zenino is the nearest rural locality.

References 

Rural localities in Valuysky District

Renamed localities of Belgorod Oblast